Vespertilionidae is a family of microbats, of the order Chiroptera, flying, insect-eating mammals variously described as the common, vesper, or simple nosed bats. The vespertilionid family is the most diverse and widely distributed of bat families, specialised in many forms to occupy a range of habitats and ecological circumstances, and it is frequently observed or the subject of research. The facial features of the species are often simple, as they mainly rely on vocally emitted echolocation. The tails of the species are enclosed by the lower flight membranes between the legs. Over 300 species are distributed all over the world, on every continent except Antarctica. It owes its name to the genus Vespertilio, which takes its name from a word for bat, derived from the Latin term  meaning 'evening'; they are termed "evening bats" and were once referred to as "evening birds". (The term "evening bat" also often refers more specifically to one of the species, Nycticeius humeralis.)

Evolution
They are allied to the suborder Microchiroptera, the families of microbats separated from the flying foxes and fruit bats of the megabat group Megachiroptera. The treatments of bat taxonomy have also included a placement amongst the Vespertilioniformes, or Yangochiroptera, as suborder Vespertilionoidea.

Molecular data indicate the Vespertilionidae diverged from the Molossidae in the early Eocene period. The family is thought to have originated somewhere in Laurasia, possibly North America. A recently extinct species, Synemporion keana, is known from the Holocene of Hawaii.

Characteristics
All species are carnivorous and most are insectivores, exceptions are bats of genera Myotis and Pizonyx that catch fish and the larger Nyctalus species known to capture small passerine birds in flight. The dentition of the family varies between species; the dental formula of the family is: 

They rely mainly on echolocation to navigate and obtain food, but they lack the elaborate nose appendages of microbats that focus nasal emitted ultrasound. The ultrasound signal is usually produced orally, and many species have large external ears to capture and reflect sound, enabling them to discriminate and extract information.

The vespertilionids employ a range of flight techniques. The wing surface is extended to the lower limbs, and the tails of this family are enclosed in an interfemoral membrane. Some are relatively slow-flying genera, such as Pipistrellus, that manipulate the configuration of their broader wing shape and may give a fluttery appearance as they forage and glean. Others are specialised as long-winged genera, such as Lasiurus and Nyctalus, that use rapid pursuit to capture insects. They are generally brown or grey in colour, often an indiscriminate appearance as a 'little brown bat', although some species have fur that is brightly colored, with reds, oranges, and yellows all being known. The patterns of the superficial appearance include white patches or stripes that may distinguish some species.

Most species roost in caves, although some make use of hollow trees, rocky crevices, animal burrows, or other forms of shelter. Colony sizes also vary greatly, with some roosting alone, and others in groups up to a million individuals. Species native to temperate latitudes typically hibernate to avoid cooler weather, while a few of the tropical species employ aestivation as a method of evading extremes of climate.

Systematics

The four subfamilies of Vespertilionidae separate the presumably related taxa, tribes, and genera of extant and extinct taxa.
The subfamilial treatments, based on morphological, geographical, and ecological comparisons have been recombined since the inclusion of the phylogenetic implications of molecular genetics; only the Murininae and Kerivoulinae have not been changed in light of genetic analysis.
Subfamilies that were once recognized as valid, such as the Nyctophilinae, are considered dubious, as molecular evidence suggests they are paraphyletic in their arrangements.
Within the concept Yangochiroptera, an acknowledged cladistic treatment, the closest relatives to the family are the free-tailed bats of family Molossidae.

The monotypic genus Tomopeas, represented by the blunt-eared bat (Tomopeas ravus), is acknowledged as the potentially closest link between the Vespertilionidae and Molossidae, as it is the most basal member of the Molossidae and has intermediate characteristics of both families.

Classification
The grouping of these subfamilies is the classification published by the American Society of Mammalogists. Other authorities raise three subfamilies more: Antrozoinae (which is here the separate family of pallid bats), Tomopeatinae (now regarded as a subfamily of the free-tailed bats), and Nyctophilinae (here included in Vespertilioninae).

Four subfamilies are recognized by Mammal Species of the World (2005), the highly diverse Vespertilioninae are also separated as tribes. Newer or resurrected genera are noted. The genus Cistugo is no longer included following its move to the separate family Cistugidae. Miniopterinae is additionally no longer recognized as a subfamily, as it was elevated to family status.

A 2021 study attempted to resolve the systematic relationships among the pipistrelle-like bats of sub-Saharan Africa and Madagascar, with systematic inferences based on genetic and morphological analyses of more than 400 individuals across all named genera and the majority of described African pipistrelle-like bat species, with a focus on previously unstudied samples of East African bats. The study proposed a revision of the pipistrelle-like bats in East Africa and described multiple new genera and species. 

Family Vespertilionidae
 subfamily Kerivoulinae
 genus Kerivoula – painted bats
 genus Phoniscus
subfamily Myotinae
 genus Eudiscopus
genus Myotis – mouse-eared bats
 genus Submyotodon – broad-muzzled bats
 subfamily Murininae
 genus Harpiocephalus – hairy-winged bats
 genus Harpiola
 genus Murina – tube-nosed insectivorous bats
 subfamily Vespertilioninae
 tribe Antrozoini
genus Antrozous
genus Bauerus
genus Rhogeessa
tribe Eptesicini
 genus Arielulus
 genus Eptesicus – house bats
 genus Glauconycteris – butterfly bats
 genus Hesperoptenus – false serotine bats
genus Histiotus – big-eared brown bats
genus Ia
genus Lasionycteris
genus Scoteanax – greater broad-nosed bats
genus Scotomanes
genus Scotorepens – lesser broad-nosed bats
genus Thainycteris
 tribe incertae sedis
genus Rhyneptesicus
tribe Lasiurini
 genus Aeorestes – hoary bats
 genus Dasypterus – yellow bats
 genus Lasiurus – hairy-tailed bats
 tribe Nycticeiini
 genus Nycticeius – evening bats
 tribe Perimyotini
genus Parastrellus
 genus Perimyotis
 tribe Pipistrellini
 genus Glischropus – thick-thumbed bats
 genus Nyctalus – noctule bats
 genus Pipistrellus – true pipistrelles
 genus Scotoecus – house bats
genus Scotozous
genus Vansonia
 tribe Plecotini
 genus Barbastella – barbastelles or barbastelle bats
 genus Corynorhinus – American lump-nosed bats
 genus Euderma
 genus Idionycteris
 genus Otonycteris
 genus Plecotus – lump-nosed bats
 tribe Scotophilini
genus Scotophilus – Old World yellow bats
tribe Vespertilionini
 genus Afronycteris 
 genus Cassistrellus – helmeted bats
genus Chalinolobus – wattled bats
 genus Falsistrellus – false pipistrelles
 genus Hypsugo – Asian pipistrelles
 genus Laephotis – long-eared bats
 genus Mimetillus – mimic bats
genus Mirostrellus
 genus Neoromicia
genus Nycticeinops
genus Nyctophilus – New Guinean and Australian big-eared bats
genus Pharotis
 genus Philetor
 genus Pseudoromicia
genus Tylonycteris – bamboo bats
 genus Vespadelus
 genus Vespertilio – frosted bats

References

Further reading

 Corbet, GB, Hill JE. 1992. The mammals of the Indomalayan region: a systematic review. Oxford University Press, Oxford.
 Karim, C., A.A. Tuen and M.T. Abdullah. 2004. Mammals. Sarawak Museum Journal Special Issue No. 6. 80: 221–234.
 Wilson DE, Reeder DM. 2005. Mammal species of the world. Smithsonian Institution Press, Washington DC.

 

Extant Eocene first appearances
Taxa named by John Edward Gray
Bat families